The following is a list of official releases by American musician Captain Beefheart.  With various line-ups of musicians called The Magic Band, Beefheart released a total of 13 studio albums recorded between 1967 and 1982, after which he left music to concentrate on a career in painting, as Don Van Vliet.  His catalogue has since been augmented with extra releases including an EP and various compilations of live material, studio outtakes and greatest hits releases.

In addition to his work with the Magic Band over this period, Beefheart also collaborated with several other musicians, most notably Frank Zappa, a friend from his teenage years with whom he worked intermittently during his musical career.

Main releases

Studio albums

EP

Live albums
 I'm Going to Do What I Wanna Do: Live at My Father's Place 1978 (2000)
 Live London '74 (2006)
 Amsterdam '80 (2006)

Compilations
 The Spotlight Kid / Clear Spot (1972)
 The Spotlight Kid / Lick My Decals Off, Baby (1973)
 Captain Beefheart File (1977)
 Music in Sea Minor (1983)
 Top Secret (1984)
 Safe as Milk / Mirror Man (1988)
 Abba Zaba (1988)
 Captain Beefheart at his Best (1989)
 The Best Beefheart (1990)
 Zig Zag Wanderer: The Collection (1991)
 I May Be Hungry but I Sure Ain't Weird: The Alternative Captain Beefheart (1992)
 A Carrot Is as Close as a Rabbit Gets to a Diamond (1993)
 Zig Zag Wanderer: The Best of the Buddah Years (1996)
 Electricity (1998)
 Grow Fins: Rarities 1965–1982 (1999)
 The Mirror Man Sessions (1999)
 The Dust Blows Forward: An Anthology (1999)
 The Best of Captain Beefheart & the Magic Band (2002)
 Hot Head: Introducing Captain Beefheart (2003)
 The Buddah Years (2006)
 It Comes to You in a Plain Brown Wrapper (2008)
 Sun Zoom Spark: 1970 to 1972 (2014)

Singles

Promotional singles

Other appearances

with Frank Zappa

 Hot Rats (1969)
 One Size Fits All (1975)
 Bongo Fury (1975) US No. 66
 Zoot Allures (1976)
 The Lost Episodes (1996)
 Mystery Disc (1998)
 Cheap Thrills (1998): "The Torture Never Stops" (original version)
Beefheart may also have performed uncredited (for contractual reasons) on other Zappa albums, including Freak Out! where he can be detected playing harmonica and singing.

Other collaborations
 The Tubes, Now (1977)
 Jack Nitzsche, "Hard Workin' Man", from the film score for Blue Collar (1978)
 Gary Lucas, Improve the Shining Hour (2000)
 Moris Tepper, Moth to Mouth (2000), Head Off "Ricochet Man" (2004)
 Sings "Happy Earthday" (adaptation of "Happy Birthday to You") on the compilation Where We Live: Stand For What You Stand On, a benefit album for Earthjustice

Films
 Ice Cream For Crow (1982) promotional video by Don Van Vliet, Ken Schreiber &  Daniel Pearl
 Some Yo Yo Stuff (1994) Directed by Anton Corbijn
 The Artist Formerly Known as Captain Beefheart (1997) BBC Documentary
 Captain Beefheart: Under Review (2006) An Independent Critical Analysis

Notes

References

External links
 Full discography at the Captain Beefheart Radar Station
 [ allmusic Captain Beefheart Main Albums]
 [ allmusic Captain Beefheart Compilations]
 [ allmusic Captain Beefheart Singles & EPs]
 [ allmusic Captain Beefheart DVDs & Videos]
 [ allmusic Captain Beefheart Other]
 

 
Discographies of American artists
Discography
Rock music discographies